Sphingobacterium caeni is a Gram-negative, non-spore-forming, rod-shaped and non-motile bacterium from the genus of Sphingobacterium which has been isolated from activated sludge.

References

External links
Type strain of Sphingobacterium caeni at BacDive -  the Bacterial Diversity Metadatabase

Sphingobacteriia
Bacteria described in 2013